The 1892–93 English football season was Aston Villa's 5th season in the Football League since its formation. George Ramsay would continue in charge of Aston Villa while the  Management Committee continued to pick the team. The season fell in what was to be called Villa's golden era.

First-class cricketer and England football international, Jack Devey  was  Captain. Denny Hodgetts also captained the team.

Frederick Rinder had become the club's financial secretary in 1892, and set about installing turnstiles at Villa's Perry Barr ground. Gate receipts immediately increased from £75 to £250. He introduced many other good business practices to the club. It was his idea to make Aston Villa a limited company.  Rinder would later be known as the 'Grand Old Man of Aston Villa'.

First Division

Results

References

Aston Villa F.C. seasons
Aston Villa F.C.